The 2021 Ladies Open Lausanne was a women's tennis tournament played on outdoor clay courts. It was the 28th edition of the Ladies Open Lausanne, and part of the 250 category of the 2021 WTA Tour. It took place at Tennis Club Stade-Lausanne in Lausanne, Switzerland, from 12 through 18 July 2021.

Champions

Singles 

  Tamara Zidanšek def.  Clara Burel, 4–6, 7–6(7–5), 6–1

This was Zidanšek's maiden WTA Tour singles title.

Doubles 

  Susan Bandecchi /  Simona Waltert def.  Ulrikke Eikeri /  Valentini Grammatikopoulou, 6–3, 6–7(3–7), [10–5]

Singles main draw entrants

Seeds

 1 Rankings are as of 28 June 2021.

Other entrants
The following players received wildcards into the main draw:
  Alycia Parks
  Tess Sugnaux
  Simona Waltert  

The following player received entry using a protected ranking:
  Alexandra Dulgheru
  Mandy Minella

The following players received entry from the qualifying draw:
  Lucia Bronzetti
  Ulrikke Eikeri 
  Valentini Grammatikopoulou
  Astra Sharma

Withdrawals 
Before the tournament
  Sorana Cîrstea → replaced by  Maryna Zanevska
  Alizé Cornet → replaced by  Francesca Di Lorenzo
  Katarzyna Kawa → replaced by  Alexandra Dulgheru
  Liudmila Samsonova → replaced by  Clara Burel
  Sloane Stephens → replaced by  Mandy Minella
  Martina Trevisan → replaced by  Marina Melnikova

Doubles main draw entrants

Seeds

1 Rankings are as of 28 June 2021.

Other entrants 
The following pairs received wildcards into the doubles main draw:
  Susan Bandecchi /  Simona Waltert
  Carole Monnet /  Gabriella Price

The following pair received entry as alternates:
  Elena Bogdan /  Alexandra Dulgheru

Withdrawals 
Before the tournament
  Akgul Amanmuradova /  Valentina Ivakhnenko → replaced by  Valentina Ivakhnenko /  Jesika Malečková 
  Anna Blinkova /  Anna-Lena Friedsam → replaced by  Elena Bogdan /  Alexandra Dulgheru
  Vivian Heisen /  Oksana Kalashnikova → replaced by  Mandy Minella /  Stefanie Vögele
During the tournament
  Katarzyna Piter /  Arantxa Rus
  Jil Teichmann /  Tamara Zidanšek
  Francesca Di Lorenzo /  Astra Sharma

References

External links 
 

Ladies Open Lausanne
Ladies Open Lausanne
WTA Swiss Open
Ladies Open Lausanne
2021 in Swiss tennis